Jelka Glumičić (11 November 1941 in Netreti%C4%87, Independent State of Croatia - 30 December 2020 Karlovac) was a human rights activist and founder of the Karlovac Human Rights Committee (in 1993), Committee for Women's Rights, Helpline for Women and Children, and of a sheltered housing project for the aged. Glumičić, in partnership with the United Nations Refugee Agency (UNHCR), founded a refugee support organization in 1997 that provided assistance to over 20,000 refugees. Her work included legal, humanitarian and psychosocial assistance to homeless internally displaced persons during the 1991-95 war and to returnees after the war.

In 2005, she was nominated for the Nobel Peace Prize by the organisation 1000 PeaceWomen, along with a group of 1000 women activists from around the globe.

References

1941 births
2020 deaths
Croatian women's rights activists
Croatian human rights activists
Children's rights activists
People from Karlovac